Rwenzururu is a subnational kingdom in western Uganda, located in the Rwenzori Mountains on the border with the Democratic Republic of the Congo. The kingdom includes the districts of Bundibugyo, Kasese and Ntoroko. Rwenzururu is also the name given to the region the kingdom is located in.

Background 

The Rwenzururu region is inhabited by the Konjo and Amba peoples.  In the early 20th century, these two tribes were integrated into the Kingdom of Toro as a political maneuver by the British colonialists: the neighboring Bunyoro monarchy was anti-colonialist and the British wished to strengthen the pro-British Toro.  The Bakonjo and Baamba initially accepted being arbitrarily made subjects of the Toro monarch with resignation, but asked the Uganda Protectorate to provide them their own district in the 1950s, separate from the Toro District. The movement declared that they were not part of the Toro Kingdom on 30 June 1962, three months before national independence.

History 
After their request was denied by the colonial authorities, the Bakonjo and Baamba launched a low-intensity guerrilla war that continued through independence. The movement carrying out the armed struggle was named "Rwenzururu".  While the movement began to achieve recognition as a separate district, it eventually became a movement to secede and form their own kingdom. The movement declared an independent Kingdom of Rwenzururu on 30 June 1962, three months before national independence, with Isaya Mukirania as king. The violence reached a height in 1963 and 1964, when Toro soldiers massacred many Konjo and Amba people as they sought to control the lower valleys. The Ugandan army intervened against the separatists, doing such significant damage to the Rwenzururu that the movement was suppressed for some time. The movement, however, achieved fame through a local folk epic.

The Rwenzururu gradually re-established itself in the collapse of the regime of Idi Amin in 1979. As government soldiers retreated in the Uganda-Tanzania War, the Rwenzururu looted the weapons and supplies left behind. Thus well-armed, the Rwenzururu was once again able to pose a serious threat to regional control from 1979 to 1982. In 1982, however, the administration of President Milton Obote negotiated a settlement with the Rwenzururu leaders in which they agreed to abandon the goal of secession in exchange for "a degree of local autonomy," the appointment of Bakonjo and Baamba to government administrative posts, and economic benefits such as vehicles and educational scholarships to be distributed by local elders. During the negotiations, the government preferred direct talks, as they believed third-party mediation would give legitimacy to the Rwenzururu claim.

Amon Bazira had been a key person in the negotiations between the Rwenzururu and Obote government. His insight was that the Rwenzururu was a largely middle class organization that could be placated with commercial prizes. He later approached President Mobutu Sese Seko of Zaire and President Daniel arap Moi of Kenya, who both had grounds for disliking the new Ugandan government led by Yoweri Museveni, for support for new Bakonjo rebellion under an organization called the National Army for the Liberation of Uganda (NALU). Bazira was shot dead in the State House in Nakuru, Kenya in 1993, a probable target of Ugandan agents. In 1995, Sudanese agents engineered the merging of the remnants of NALU with the Uganda Muslim Liberation Army and the Baganda monarchist Allied Democratic Movement in order to give these latter organizations a local constituency, creating the Allied Democratic Forces.

Government recognition 
A survey carried out by Makerere University found that 87% of the local population in Rwenzururu favored the creation of a kingdom.  In 2005, President Museveni directed a ministerial committee headed by Second Deputy Prime Minister and Minister for Public Service Henry Kajura to investigate the Rwenzururu claim to a kingdom and issue a report of his findings. The report stated that over 80% of the Bakonjo and Baamba favoured the creation of a kingdom with Charles Mumbere as the Omusinga (king). It further found that there is no historical claim for a Rwenzururu kingdom or a group of people called Banyarwenzururu, but recommended that the government bow to the wishes of the people. Pursuant to these recommendations, on 17 March 2008 the Ugandan cabinet endorsed the Kingdom of Rwenzururu as a cultural institution and crowned Mumbere as Omusinga Irema-Ngoma I. Three contenders for the throne criticized the government's recognition of Mumbere as Omusinga.

See also 
 2016 Kasese clashes

References

Further reading 
 Arthur Syahuku-Muhindo, "The Rwenzururu Movement and the Democratic Struggle," in M. Mamdani and J. Oloka-Onyango, eds., Uganda: Studies in Living Conditions, Popular Movements and Constitutionalism (Vienna: JEP Books, 1994), p. 273-317.

 Stacey, Tom (2003). Tribe: The Hidden History of the Mountains of the Moon. Stacey International. .

Kingdom of Rwenzururu
Rwenzori Mountains
Ugandan monarchies
History of Uganda
States and territories established in 1962
Non-sovereign monarchy